Ancylolomia chrysographellus, the angled grass moth, is a species of moth in the family Crambidae. It is found on Cyprus and in Kenya, Uganda, Yemen, India, Pakistan, Sri Lanka, Myanmar, China, Korea, Japan, Taiwan, the Philippines and Indonesia.

Description
The wingspan is 25–30 mm for females and 20 mm for males. Antennae of male with short uniseriate laminated branches, which is simple in female. It is a brownish-ochreous moth. Forewings with silvery and yellow fascia, with streaks of black scales on them in cell and the interspaces beyond and below it. A minutely dentate submarginal silvery line with a more prominent tooth at vein 3. A whitish marginal band with a series of dark specks on it. Cilia silvery. Hindwings whitish, pale fuscous, or dark fuscous in Sri Lankan specimens. The forewings may have a white fascia developed on median nervure.

It is a minor pest of rice. The larvae are known to feed on many grasses.

References

Moths described in 1844
Ancylolomia
Moths of Africa
Moths of Asia